1.FK Svidník is a Slovak football team, based in the town of Svidník. The club was founded in 1925.

History 
In August 2015, club announced merger within one year with ŠK Futura Humenné.

Clubname history 
 OZKN Dekoplas 1991–1992
 ŠK Surmex 1992–1993
 MFK Dukla 1995–1996
 Svidnícky FK 1999–2000
 FK Drustav Svidník 2002–2015
 ŠK Futura Svidník 2015–2016
 1.FK Svidník 2016–present

References

External links 
at fk.svidnik.org 

1.FK Svidnik
Association football clubs established in 1925
1925 establishments in Slovakia